This article serves as an index - as complete as possible - of all the honorific orders or similar decorations received by the Pahang Royal Family, classified by continent, awarding country and recipient.
juliarais0
The Sultan of Pahang and members of the Sultan's family have received many honours from different states of Malaysia and from other nations.

Sultanate of Pahang 

They have been awarded:

Family of Al-Sultan Abdullah Ri'ayatuddin Al-Mustafa Billah Shah ibni Almarhum Sultan Haji Ahmad Shah Al-Musta'in Billah 

 Al-Sultan Abdullah Ri'ayatuddin Al-Mustafa Billah Shah ibni Almarhum Sultan Haji Ahmad Shah Al-Musta'in Billah, Sultan of Pahang : 
  Grand Master and Member (DKP) of the Royal Family Order of Pahang (since 11 January 2019)
  Grand Master and Member 1st class (DK I) of the Family Order of the Crown of Indra of Pahang (since 1975)
  Grand Master and Grand Knight of the Order of Sultan Ahmad Shah of Pahang (SSAP, since 24 October 1980) with title Dato’ Sri
  Grand Knight (SIMP) and Grand Master of the Order of the Crown of Pahang
 Tunku Azizah, sultan's wife :
  Member 1st class of the Family Order of the Crown of Indra of Pahang
  Grand Knight of the Order of Sultan Ahmad Shah of Pahang (SSAP) with title Datuk Sri
  Grand Knight of the Order of the Crown of Pahang  (SIMP) with title Datuk Indera
 Tengku Hassanal Ibrahim Alam Shah, Crown Prince of Pahang :
  Member 1st class of the Family Order of the Crown of Indra of Pahang (DK I) (29 January 2019)
  Grand Knight of the Order of Sultan Ahmad Shah of Pahang (SSAP, 24 October 2016) with title Datuk Sri 
  Grand Knight of the Order of the Crown of Pahang (SIMP) with title Datuk Indera
 Tengku Amir Nasser Ibrahim, Adoptive son of sultan
  Grand Knight of the Order of Sultan Ahmad Shah of Pahang (SSAP, 15 October 2020) with title Datuk Sri 
  Grand Knight of the Order of the Crown of Pahang (SIMP) with title Datuk Indera
 Tengku Muhammad Iskandar Riayatuddin Shah, second son of sultan
  Grand Knight of the Order of Sultan Ahmad Shah of Pahang (SSAP, 15 October 2020) with title Datuk Sri 
 Tengku Ahmad Ismail Muadzam Shah, third son of sultan
  Grand Knight of the Order of the Crown of Pahang (SIMP, 15 October 2020) with title Datuk Indera
 Tengku Puteri Iman Afzan, first daughter of sultan
  Grand Knight of the Order of Sultan Ahmad Shah of Pahang (SSAP, 15 October 2020) with title Datuk Sri 
 Tengku Puteri Ilisha Ameera, second daughter of sultan
  Grand Knight of the Order of the Crown of Pahang (SIMP, 15 October 2020) with title Datuk Indera
 Tengku Puteri Ilyana, third daughter of sultan
  Grand Knight of the Order of the Crown of Pahang (SIMP, 15 October 2020) with title Datuk Indera
 Tengku Puteri Afzan Aminah Hafidzatu’llah, fourth daughter of sultan
  Grand Knight of the Order of the Crown of Pahang (SIMP, 15 October 2020) with title Datuk Indera
 Tengku Puteri Jihan Azizah Athiyatullah, fifth daughter of sultan
  Grand Knight of the Order of the Crown of Pahang (SIMP, 15 October 2020) with title Datuk Indera

Family of Sultan Haji Ahmad Shah Al-Musta’in Billah ibni Almarhum Sultan Abu Bakar Ri’ayatuddin Al-Mu’azzam Shah 

 Cik Puan Besar Hajjah Kalsom binti Abdullah, The second wife of Sultan Haji Ahmad Shah
  Grand Master and Member 1st class (DK I) of the Family Order of the Crown of Indra of Pahang 
 Tengku Abdul Rahman, Tengku Muda, Sultan Haji Ahmad Shah's second son
  Member 2nd class of the Family Order of the Crown of Indra of Pahang (DK II) 
  Grand Knight of the Order of Sultan Ahmad Shah of Pahang (SSAP, 24.10.1980) with title Datuk Sri
  Grand Knight (or Datuk Sri) of the Order of the Crown of Pahang (SIMP) with title Datuk Sri
 Tengku Abdul Fahd Muadzam, Tengku Arif Temenggong, Sultan Haji Ahmad Shah's third son
  Member 2nd class of the Family Order of the Crown of Indra of Pahang (DK II)
 Tengku Meriam, Tengku Putri Sri Lela Wangsa, Sultan Haji Ahmad Shah's first daughter :
  Member 2nd class of the Family Order of the Crown of Indra of Pahang (DK II) 
  Grand Knight (or Datuk Sri) of the Order of the Crown of Pahang (SIMP) with title Datuk Sri
 Tengku Muhaini, Tengku Putri Sri Teja, Sultan Haji Ahmad Shah's second daughter :
  Member 2nd class of the Family Order of the Crown of Indra of Pahang (DK II) 
  Grand Knight (or Datuk Sri) of the Order of the Crown of Pahang (SIMP) with title Datuk Sri
 Tengku Aishah Marcella, Tengku Putri Sri Kamala, Sultan Haji Ahmad Shah's third daughter :
  Member 2nd class of the Family Order of the Crown of Indra of Pahang (DK II) 
  Grand Knight (or Datuk Sri) of the Order of the Crown of Pahang (SIMP) with title Datuk Sri
 Tengku Nong Fatimah, Tengku Putri Sri Setia Bakti, Sultan Haji Ahmad Shah's fourth daughter :
  Member 2nd class of the Family Order of the Crown of Indra of Pahang (DK II, 24.10.2000)
  Grand Knight (or Datuk Sri) of the Order of the Crown of Pahang (SIMP, 24.10.1988) with title Datuk Sri
 Tengku Shahariah, Tengku Putri Sri Bongsu, Sultan Haji Ahmad Shah's fifth daughter :
  Member 2nd class of the Family Order of the Crown of Indra of Pahang (DK II)
  Grand Knight (or Datuk Sri) of the Order of the Crown of Pahang (SIMP, 24.10.2000) with title Datuk Sri
 Tengku Ibrahim, Tengku Arif Bendahara, Sultan Haji Ahmad Shah's eldest younger brother.
  Grand Knight of the Order of Sultan Ahmad Shah of Pahang (SSAP) with title Datuk Sri
  Grand Knight (or Datuk Sri) of the Order of the Crown of Pahang (SIMP) with title Datuk Sri
 Tengku Abdullah, Tengku Arif Bendahara, Sultan Haji Ahmad Shah's second younger brother.
  Member 2nd class of the Family Order of the Crown of Indra of Pahang (DK II, 25.10.2002), 
  Grand Knight of the Order of Sultan Ahmad Shah of Pahang (SSAP, 24.10.1992) with title Datuk Sri
  Grand Knight (or Datuk Sri) of the Order of the Crown of Pahang (SIMP) with title Datuk Sri
 Habibah, Cik Puan Bendahara, his wife  
  Knight Companion of the Order of Sultan Ahmad Shah of Pahang (DSAP, 25.10.2002) with title Datuk
  Grand Knight (or Datuk Sri) of the Order of the Crown of Pahang (SIMP) with title Datuk Sri
 Tengku Marsilla, their daughter
  Grand Knight (or Datuk Sri) of the Order of the Crown of Pahang (SIMP, 24.10.2009) with title Datuk Sri
 Tengku Azlan, Sultan Haji Ahmad Shah's younger brother.
  Knight Companion of the Order of Sultan Ahmad Shah of Pahang (DSAP, 1989)
  Grand Knight (or Datuk Sri) of the Order of the Crown of Pahang (SIMP, 25.10.2002) with title Datuk Sri
 Tengku Omar, Sultan Haji Ahmad Shah's younger brother. 
  Knight Companion of the Order of Sultan Ahmad Shah of Pahang (DSAP, 1994) with title Datuk
 Tengku Azman, Sultan Haji Ahmad Shah's younger brother. 
  Knight Companion of the Order of Sultan Ahmad Shah of Pahang (DSAP) with title Datuk
  Grand Knight (or Datuk Sri) of the Order of the Crown of Pahang (SIMP, 25.10.2002) with title Datuk Sri
 Tengku Kamal Baharin, Sultan Haji Ahmad Shah's younger brother. 
  Grand Knight of the Order of Sultan Ahmad Shah of Pahang (SSAP, 26.10.2005) with title Datuk Sri
  Knight Companion of the Order of the Crown of Pahang (DIMP, 24.10.1995) with title Datuk

Malaysia, sultanates and states 
They have been awarded:

Malaysia 

 Abdullah of Pahang (as Yang di-Pertuan Agong, 31 January 2019 – present) : 
  Recipient (DKM, 11 July 2019) and Grand Master of Order of the Royal House of Malaysia (31 January 2019)
  Recipient (DMN, 14 February 2019) and Grand Master of the Order of the Crown of the Realm (31 January 2019) 
  Grand Master of the Order of the Defender of the Realm (31 January 2019)
  Grand Master of the Order of Loyalty to the Crown of Malaysia (31 January 2019)
  Grand Master of the Order of Merit of Malaysia (31 January 2019)
  Grand Master of the Order for Important Services (31 January 2019) 
  Grand Master of the Order of the Royal Household of Malaysia (31 January 2019)
  Commander of the Order of Military Service (PAT)
 Tunku Azizah, sultan's wife  (as wife of the Yang di-Pertuan Agong, 31 January 2019 – present) : 
  Recipient of the Order of the Crown of the Realm (DMN, 11 July 2019) 
 Tengku Meriam, first daughter of the sultan :
  Commander of the Order of Loyalty to the Crown of Malaysia (PSM, 1984)
 Tengku Ibrahim, Tengku Arif Bendahara, eldest younger brother of the sultan.
  Commander of the Order of Loyalty to the Crown of Malaysia (PSM, 1983)

Sultanate of Johor 
 Abdullah of Pahang, Sultan of Pahang & brother-in-law of Sultan Ibrahim Ismail of Johor:
  First Class of the Royal Family Order of Johor (DK I)
  Knight Grand Commander of the Order of the Crown of Johor (SPMJ)
 Tunku Azizah Sultan Pahang's wife & sister of Sultan Ibrahim Ismail of Johor :
  First Class of the Royal Family Order of Johor (DK I)
  Knight Grand Commander of the Order of the Crown of Johor (SPMJ)

Sultanate of Kedah 

 Abdullah of Pahang : 
  Member of the Royal Family Order of Kedah (DK, 5 September 2019)

Sultanate of Kelantan 

To be completed if any ...

Sultanate of Negeri Sembilan 

To be completed if any ...

Sultanate of Perak 

 Abdullah of Pahang : 
  Recipient of the Royal Family Order of Perak (DK, 28 November 2019)

Kingdom of Perlis 

 Abdullah of Pahang : 
  Recipient of the Perlis Family Order of the Gallant Prince Syed Putra Jamalullail (DK, 28 October 2019)

Sultanate of Selangor 

To be completed if any ...

Sultanate of Terengganu 

 Abdullah of Pahang : 
  Member first class of the Family Order of Terengganu (DK I)

Asian honours 
They have been awarded:

Brunei 
 Abdullah of Pahang (Yang di-Pertuan Agong, 31 January 2019 – present) : 
  Recipient of Royal Family Order of the Crown of Brunei (DKMB, 19 August 2019)
  Sultan of Brunei Golden Jubilee Medal (5 October 2017)
 Tunku Azizah (as wife of the Yang di-Pertuan Agong, 31 January 2019 – present)
  Senior (Laila Utama) of the Most Esteemed Family Order of Laila Utama (DK, 19 August 2019)

References

Notes 

 
Pahang